

Main languages 
The two official languages of Tajikistan are Russian as the interethnic language and Tajik as the state language, as understood in Article 2 of the Constitution: "The state language of Tajikistan shall be Tajik. Russian shall be the language of international communication." Tajikistan is one of three former Soviet republics in Central Asia to have Russian as a de jure official language, along with Kazakhstan and Kyrgyzstan.

The highly educated part of the population of Tajikistan, as well as the intelligentsia, prefer to speak Persian — the pronunciation of which in Tajikistan is called the “Iranian style” — and Russian.

Official languages

Tajik 

The state (national) language of the Republic of Tajikistan is Tajik, which is written in the Tajik Cyrillic alphabet. Tajik speakers have no problems communicating with Persian speakers from Iran and Dari speakers from Afghanistan, as the Tajik language, according to several linguists, is a variant of the Persian language. Several million native Tajik speakers also live in neighboring Uzbekistan and in Russia.

Russian 

According to article 2 of the Constitution of the Republic of Tajikistan, Russian is recognized as the second official language of Tajikistan; the official language of inter-ethnic communication. Russian had previously lost its official status after Tajikistan's independence in late 1991, which was then restored with the Constitution.

Approximately 90% of the population of Tajikistan speaks Russian at various levels. The varieties of Russian spoken in Tajikistan are referred to by scholars as Tajik(istani) Russian  and it shares some similarities with Uzbek(istani) Russian — and Central Asian varieties of the Russian language in general — such as morphological differences and the lexical differences like the use of words урюк for a wild apricot or кислушка for rhubarb. Previously, from the creation of the Tajikistan SSR until Tajik became the official language of the Tajikistan Soviet Socialist Republic on July 22, 1989, the only official language of the republic was the Russian language, and the Tajik language had only the status of the “national language”.

Colloquial speech has retained almost all Russian borrowed elements (with the exception of words of purely Soviet semantics). Most borrowings, especially colloquial ones, change their phonetics and acquire a sound that is more suitable for the Tajik ear. In most cases, this means, first of all, a change of stress (in the Tajik language, a fixed stress on the last syllable) - картошка, майка; loss of a soft sign that is absent in Tajik - апрел, контрол, change of the sound "ц" to the sound "с" - сирк (цирк), консерт (концерт), frequent replacement of the sound "А" with the sound "О" - мошин (машина), the sound "Ы" for the sound "И" - вибор (выбор), disappearance of the ending to zero - конфет. However, a number of words remain unchanged: март, газета.

Significant minority languages

Uzbek 
Apart from Russian, Uzbek is actually the second most widely spoken language in Tajikistan after Tajik. Native Uzbek speakers live in the north and west of Tajikistan.

Other minority languages 
In fourth place (after Tajik, Russian and Uzbek) by number of native speakers are various Pamir languages, whose native speakers live in Kuhistani Badakshshan Autonomous Region. The majority of Zoroastrians in Tajikistan speak one of the Pamir languages. Pamiri often view the exclusion of their languages from educational and official spheres in favour of Tajik as threatening intentional and gradual assimilation. The only support for their languages is from the private Aga Khan foundation. Moreover, Pamiris rarely occupy higher positions of power than first deputy and are not present in law enforcement and security owing to suspicions of anti-government sympathies — such as during the Tajikistani Civil War — and more favourable views towards Russia and Russians contextualised in the annexation of Crimea by the Russian Federation. 

Native speakers of the Kyrgyz language live in the north of Kuhistani Badakshshan Autonomous Region. 

Yagnobi language speakers live in the west of the country. The Parya language of local Romani people (Central Asian Romani) is also widely spoken in Tajikistan. Tajikistan also has small communities of native speakers of Persian, Arabic, Pashto, Eastern Armenian, Azerbaijani, Tatar, Turkmen, Kazakh, Chinese, Ukrainian.

Foreign languages 
Among foreign languages, the most popular European language is English, which is taught in schools in Tajikistan as one of the foreign languages. Some young people, as well as those working in the tourism sector of Tajikistan, speak English at different levels. Of the European languages, there are also a number of native speakers of German and French. *

Many among the Uzbek population learn Turkish in addition to Russian.

Additionally, Mandarin Chinese has grown to become a popular language of study.

See also
Demographics of Tajikistan

References

Languages of Tajikistan